Vanzant is an unincorporated community in northeastern Douglas County, Missouri, United States. It is located on Route 95 at the intersection with state route W, approximately one mile south of Route 76 and thirteen miles south of Mountain Grove. The community of Drury is about three miles south on Route 95. Vanzant post office was established in 1892 and was assigned a zip code of 65768. The community was named after an early settler.

The Vanzant community church is located to the north at the intersection of Routes 95 and 76 and the Vanzant cemetery is about one half mile to the southeast on route W. The community is within the northwest corner of a section of the Mark Twain National Forest.

References

Unincorporated communities in Douglas County, Missouri
Unincorporated communities in Missouri